Liquid air is air that has been cooled to very low temperatures.

Liquid air may also refer to:

Liquid Air, was an early automobile
Liquid Air (EP), is an EP by German band Air Liquide

See also
Air Liquide, a company supplying industrial gases
Air Liquide (band), is a German band
Air Liquide (album), is an album by Air Liquide